The Howard Hanson House is a historic house in Wahoo, Nebraska. It was built in 1888, and designed in the Queen Anne style. It was the childhood home of Howard Hanson, who served as the director of the University of Rochester's Eastman School of Music for four decades. Hanson's parents owned the house from 1891 to 1943. It was purchased by the Wahoo Women's Club in the 1960s and turned into a house museum. It has been listed on the National Register of Historic Places since January 27, 1983.

References

National Register of Historic Places in Saunders County, Nebraska
Queen Anne architecture in Nebraska
Houses completed in 1888